Pictures at Eleven is the debut solo album by former Led Zeppelin singer Robert Plant, released on 25 June 1982 in the US and on 2 July in the UK.  Genesis drummer Phil Collins played drums for five of the album's eight songs. Ex-Rainbow drummer Cozy Powell handled drums on "Slow Dancer" and "Like I've Never Been Gone." On the song "Fat Lip", guitarist Robbie Blunt played a TR-808 drum machine. The title was an often-heard phrase in U.S. television news that would follow a brief announcement of a story of interest to be shown later during a station's 11 PM news program. Pictures at Eleven is the only one of Plant's solo albums to appear on Led Zeppelin's record label Swan Song. By the time of Plant's next release, 1983's The Principle of Moments, Swan Song had ceased to function, and Plant had started his own label named Es Paranza, which would also be distributed by Atlantic Records. Rhino Entertainment released a remastered edition of the album, with bonus tracks, on 20 March 2007.

Critical reception 

In a contemporary review for Rolling Stone, Kurt Loder wrote, "even though there's nothing new going on in these grooves, the sheer formal thrill of hearing someone who knows exactly what he's doing makes Pictures at Eleven something of an event almost in spite of its modest ambitions." Robert Christgau from The Village Voice was impressed by Plant's ability to recreate Led Zeppelin's aural sensibilities with duller musicians and catchier undertones, but ultimately found the music somewhat insignificant.

Track listing

Personnel
Robert Plant – vocals
Robbie Blunt – guitars, TR-808 on track 6
Jezz Woodroffe – keyboards, synthesizers,
Phil Collins – drums on tracks 1-3, 5, 8, all bonus tracks
Cozy Powell – drums on tracks 4 and 7
Paul Martinez – bass guitar
Raphael Ravenscroft – saxophone on track 3

Charts

Certifications

References

External links
Official Robert Plant Website
Rockfield Studios

Robert Plant albums
1982 debut albums
Swan Song Records albums
Albums recorded at Rockfield Studios